Stourton railway station served the area of Stourton, in the historic county of West Riding of Yorkshire, England, in 1904 on the East and West Yorkshire Union Railway.

History
The station was opened on 4 January 1904 by the East and West Yorkshire Union Railway. It was a very short-lived station, only being open for under 9 months before closing along with the line on 1 October 1904.

References

Disused railway stations in West Yorkshire
Railway stations in Great Britain opened in 1904
Railway stations in Great Britain closed in 1904
1904 establishments in England
1904 disestablishments in England